The Fifth Sunday of Easter is the Sunday four weeks after the Christian celebration of Easter. In Western Christianity, this day is also known as the Fourth Sunday after Easter or Cantate Sunday. Eastern Christianity also calls this day the "Fifth Sunday," but typically using an Eastern synonym for Easter; for example, Fifth Sunday of Holy Pascha (as in the Byzantine Rite) or Fifth Sunday of the Resurrection (as in the West Syriac and East Syriac Rites). In the Byzantine Rite, this day is also known as the Sunday of the Samaritan Woman.

Western Christianity 

The name "Fifth Sunday of Easter" is used among Roman Catholic, Anglican, Lutheran, Presbyterian, Methodist, and other Western Christian liturgical churches. It is the name given to this day in the Roman Missal (used in the Roman Rite of the Catholic Church) and in the Revised Common Lectionary (widely used among English-speaking mainline Protestants). Tridentine editions of the Roman Missal called this day the Fourth Sunday after Easter, as do traditional versions of the Book of Common Prayer.

This day is also known as Cantate Sunday due to the incipit "Cantáte Dómino" (Sing to the Lord) of the introit assigned to this day in the Roman Rite. The full text of the introit in its original Latin is: "Cantáte Dómino cánticum novum, allelúia: quia mirabília fecit Dóminus, allelúia: ante conspéctum géntium revelávit iustítiam suam, allelúia, allelúia, allelúia. Salvávit sibi déxtera eius: et bráchium sanctum eius."

For a brief period of time (1870–1911), this day was also known as the Octave Day of the Solemnity of St. Joseph, Patron of the Universal Church in the Roman Rite of the Catholic Church. This octave day was the follow-up to the original feast on the previous Sunday.

Eastern Christianity 

In the Byzantine Rite, this day is called the Fifth Sunday of Holy Pascha, and is also called the Sunday of the Samaritan Woman due to the Gospel passage read on this day.

See also 
 Eastertide

References 

Christian Sunday observances
Eastertide